is Yukihiro Takahashi's second solo album, released when he was a member of YMO. As well as his YMO bandmates Ryuichi Sakamoto and Haruomi Hosono, and longtime YMO collaborator Hideki Matsutake this album also features contributions from Sandii and Makoto Ayukawa of Sheena & the Rokkets.

In Japan this album reached No 12 on the general Oricon chart, and No. 14 on the Oricon LP chart.

Track listing

Personnel
Yukihiro Takahashi - Producer, Arranger, Lead Vocals, Vocoder, Drums, Percussion
Ryuichi Sakamoto - Synthesizers, Synthesizer Programming, Electric & Acoustic Piano, Vocoder
Haruomi Hosono - Acoustic Guitar, Bass Guitar
Sandii - Backing Vocals
Hideki Matsutake - Computer Operator
Kenji Omura - Electric Guitar
Makoto Ayukawa - Electric Guitar
"Teppei" Kasai - Engineer
Toshiro Itoh - Engineer
Seiichi Chiba - Recording Engineer
Chris Mosdell - Lyrics, Quasimutanic voice

Staff
Mitsuru Torii - Art Direction
"Bricks" - Costume
"Donbay" Nagata - Equipment Co-ordinator
Mikio Honda - Hair & Make Up
Hiroshi Okura - Management
Yoichi Itoh - Production Co-ordinator
Kenji Ando - Recording Director
Masayoshi Sukita - Photography

References

External links 

1980 albums
Yukihiro Takahashi albums
King Records (Japan) albums